Mubarak Al-Breik (Arabic:مبارك البريك) (born 27 April 1995) is a Qatari footballer who plays as a midfielder.

References

External links
 

Qatari footballers
1995 births
Living people
Umm Salal SC players
Al-Khor SC players
Qatar Stars League players
Place of birth missing (living people)
Association football midfielders